The 1992 Air Force Falcons football team represented the United States Air Force Academy in the 1992 NCAA Division I-A football season. The team was led by ninth-year head coach Fisher DeBerry and played its home games at Falcon Stadium. It finished the regular season with a 7–5 record overall and a 4–4 record in Western Athletic Conference games. The team was selected to play in the Liberty Bowl, in which it lost to Ole Miss.

Schedule

Personnel

Game summaries

Navy
Chris McInnis kicked game-winning 37-yard field goal with 49 seconds left for the win.

References

Air Force
Air Force Falcons football seasons
Air Force Falcons football